FC Advis Khmelnytskyi was a Ukrainian football club from Khmelnytskyi. In 1994–95 and 1995–96 seasons played at the professional level. In 1995 it merged with FC Temp Shepetivka, after which Temp in the Ukrainian First League was replaced with Temp-Advis, while Advis – with Temp-Advis-2. Thus, FC Advis Khmelnytskyi became the second squad of the new Temp-Advis club. However after playing only seven games in a new season, the team withdrew and its results were annulled.

League and cup history

{|class="wikitable"
|-bgcolor="#efefef"
! Season
! Div.
! Pos.
! Pl.
! W
! D
! L
! GS
! GA
! P
!Domestic Cup
!colspan=2|Europe
!Notes
|}

References

 
Football clubs in Khmelnytskyi Oblast
Advis Khmelnytskyi
Sport in Khmelnytskyi, Ukraine
Association football clubs disestablished in 1998
1998 disestablishments in Ukraine